The Northport Bridge spans the Columbia River near Northport, Washington, close to the border with Canada. The steel cantilever through-truss bridge replaced an 1897 timber bridge, and was opened in 1951. It carries Washington State Route 25. It is one of a series of similar bridges built at about the same time, including the Grand Coulee Bridge and the Kettle Falls Bridges.

The bridge opened to traffic on June 13, 1951, at a cost of $1,751,587.

The bridge was designed by George Stevens of the Washington State Highways, and the main span was built by the Midland Structural Steel Company. Work began in August 1946. Floods in 1948 undermined the south main pier of the steel structure, causing the design to be changed from a section of earth fill to five additional T-beam concrete approach spans. Underwater blasting was required to remove the south pier for the altered work, resulting in a  series of concrete approach spans on the south.

The Northport Bridge was placed on the National Register of Historic Places on May 24, 1995.

References

Road bridges on the National Register of Historic Places in Washington (state)
Bridges over the Columbia River
Transportation buildings and structures in Stevens County, Washington
Bridges completed in 1951
National Register of Historic Places in Stevens County, Washington
1951 establishments in Washington (state)
Steel bridges in the United States
Cantilever bridges in the United States